The FIS Alpine Ski Europa Cup is a second level international alpine skiing circuit organized annually by the International Ski Federation (FIS) beginning with the 1971–72 season.

Although held in Europe, these races are also open to non-European skiers.

Overall podium
All rankings and results.

Men

Women

See also
 FIS Alpine Ski World Cup - the top level circuit of international alpine ski competition
 Nor-Am Cup - the North American equivalent of the Europa Cup

References

External links
 FIS official site

Europa Cup
Alpine
Recurring sporting events established in 1971
Alpine skiing